Jennie Wecksell (born 7 July 1991) is a Swedish football defender.

Honours 
KIF Örebro DFF
Winner
 Swedish Cup: 2010

Runner-up
 Damallsvenskan: 2014

References

External links 
 
 
 KIF Örebro DFF player profile
 

1991 births
Living people
Swedish women's footballers
KIF Örebro DFF players
Damallsvenskan players
Women's association football defenders